Rich Coady may refer to:

 Rich Coady (center) (born 1944), American football center
 Rich Coady (defensive back) (born 1976), American football defensive back, son of the former